Michael Matheson may refer to:

Michael Matheson (politician) (born 1970), Cabinet Secretary for Transport, Infrastructure and Connectivity in the Scottish Government
Michael Matheson, fictional character in the 2009 film Grace 
Mike Matheson (born 1994), Canadian ice hockey player